Narongnoi Kiatbandit; is a Thai Muay Thai fighter who competed during the 1970s.

Biography and career

Amnat Boonrod was born in the Ayutthaya province where he started Muay Thai training at the age of 14 by himself. He was fighting in temples under the name Raksak Thanomsak (รักศักดิ์ ถนอมศักดิ์). A year later he joined the Kiatbandit camp in Bangkok and made his debut at Lumpinee Stadium winning by knockout in the second round.

Between 1974 and 1980 Narongnoi was one of the most dominant fighters in Muay Thai. He won the Rajadamnern Stadium titles at 126 and 130 lbs. He holds wins against notable fighters such as Nongkhai Sor.Prapatsorn, Jocky Sitkanpai, Ruengsak Porntawee, Khunponnoi Kiatsuriya, Sagat Petchyindee, Vicharnnoi Porntawee, Jitti Muangkhonkaen and Toshio Fujiwara. His best purses reached 120,000 baht.

On March 12, 1977, in Los Angeles Narongnoi faced famous American kickboxer Benny Urquidez for the WKA world title. Narongnoi was warned for illegal attacks  before being deducted a point. This came after Narongnoi had scored a flash-knockdown which provoked a riot among fans in the audience who invaded the ring before the end of the fight. The California State Athletic Commission declared the no-contest.

After his retirement Narongnoi became a successful businessman. In 2009 he suffered a stroke which left him in a coma.

Titles and accomplishments
Rajadamnern Stadium
 1975 Rajadamnern Stadium 126 lbs Champion
 1978 Rajadamnern Stadium 130 lbs Champion (Two title defenses)

Fight record

|-  style="background:#fbb;"
| 1982-07-26 || Loss ||align=left| Fanta Phetmuangtrat|| Rajadamnern Stadium || Bangkok, Thailand || Decision || 5 || 3:00

|-  style="background:#fbb;"
| 1982-03-10 || Loss ||align=left| Singpathom Pongsurakarn || Rajadamnern Stadium || Bangkok, Thailand || Decision || 5 || 3:00

|-  style="background:#fbb;"
| 1981-12- || Loss ||align=left| Tawanook Sitpoonchai || Rajadamnern Stadium || Bangkok, Thailand || Decision || 5 || 3:00

|-  style="background:#fbb;"
| 1981-11-13 || Loss ||align=left| Pannoi Sakornpitak || Lumpinee Stadium || Bangkok, Thailand || Decision || 5 || 3:00

|-  style="background:#fbb;"
| 1981-09-28 || Loss ||align=left| Kengkaj Kiatkriangkrai || Rajadamnern Stadium || Bangkok, Thailand || Decision || 5 || 3:00

|-  style="background:#cfc;"
| 1981-08-06 || Win ||align=left| Nongkhai Sor.Prapatsorn || Rajadamnern Stadium || Bangkok, Thailand || Decision || 5 ||3:00

|-  style="background:#fbb;"
| 1981-06-18 || Loss ||align=left| Kengkla Sitsei || Rajadamnern Stadium || Bangkok, Thailand || Decision || 5 || 3:00

|-  style="background:#cfc;"
| 1981-04-29 || Win ||align=left| Kengkla Sitsei || Rajadamnern Stadium || Bangkok, Thailand || Decision || 5 || 3:00

|-  style="background:#fbb;"
| 1981-02-05 || Loss ||align=left| Nongkhai Sor.Prapatsorn || Rajadamnern Stadium || Bangkok, Thailand || Decision || 5 ||3:00
|-
! style=background:white colspan=9 |

|-  style="background:#cfc;"
| 1980-11-27 || Win ||align=left| Khaosod Sitpraprom || Rajadamnern Stadium || Bangkok, Thailand || Decision|| 5 || 3:00

|-  style="background:#fbb;"
| 1980-07-03 || Loss ||align=left| Kengkaj Kiatkriangkrai || Rajadamnern Stadium || Bangkok, Thailand || Decision || 5 || 3:00

|-  style="background:#fbb;"
| 1980-03-05 || Loss ||align=left| Kaopong Sitichuchai || Rajadamnern Stadium || Bangkok, Thailand || Decision || 5 || 3:00

|-  style="background:#fbb;"
| 1980-01-22 || Loss ||align=left| Padejsuk Pitsanurachan|| Lumpinee Stadium || Bangkok, Thailand || Decision || 5 || 3:00

|-  style="background:#cfc;"
| 1979-09-27 || Win ||align=left| Prawit Sritham || Rajadamnern Stadium || Bangkok, Thailand || Decision || 5 ||3:00
|-
! style=background:white colspan=9 |

|-  style="background:#cfc;"
| 1979-08-15 || Win ||align=left| Khaosod Sitpraprom || Rajadamnern Stadium || Bangkok, Thailand || Decision || 5 ||3:00
|-
! style=background:white colspan=9 |

|-  style="background:#fbb;"
| 1979-06-28 || Loss ||align=left| Prawit Sritham || Rajadamnern Stadium || Bangkok, Thailand || Decision || 5 ||3:00

|-  style="background:#cfc;"
| 1979-05-09 || Win ||align=left| Nongkhai Sor.Prapatsorn || Rajadamnern Stadium || Bangkok, Thailand || Decision || 5 ||3:00
|-
! style=background:white colspan=9 |

|-  style="background:#fbb;"
| 1979-04-09 || Loss ||align=left| Pannoi Sakornpitak || Rajadamnern Stadium || Bangkok, Thailand || Decision || 5 || 3:00

|-  style="background:#cfc;"
| 1979-02-12 || Win ||align=left| Toshio Fujiwara || Rajadamnern Stadium || Bangkok, Thailand || Decision || 5 ||3:00
|-
! style=background:white colspan=9 |

|-  style="background:#fbb;"
| 1979-01-17 || Loss ||align=left| Padejsuk Pitsanurachan|| Rajadamnern Stadium || Bangkok, Thailand || Decision || 5 || 3:00

|-  style="background:#fbb;"
| 1978-12-06 || Loss ||align=left| Dieselnoi Chor Thanasukarn || Rajadamnern Stadium || Bangkok, Thailand || Decision || 5 || 3:00

|-  style="background:#cfc;"
| 1978-08-28 || Win ||align=left| Kengkaj Kiatkriangkrai ||  Rajadamnern Stadium || Bangkok, Thailand || Decision || 5 || 3:00

|-  style="background:#fbb;"
| 1978-08-05 || Loss ||align=left| Vicharnnoi Porntawee ||  || Hat Yai, Thailand || Decision || 5 || 3:00

|-  style="background:#cfc;"
| 1978-06-02 || Win ||align=left| Vicharnnoi Porntawee || Rajadamnern Stadium || Bangkok, Thailand || Decision || 5 || 3:00
|-
! style=background:white colspan=9 |

|-  style="background:#cfc;"
| 1978-03-29 || Win ||align=left| Jitti Muangkhonkaen ||Rajadamnern Stadium || Bangkok, Thailand || Decision || 5||3:00

|-  style="background:#cfc;"
| 1978-01-18 || Win ||align=left| Jocky Sitkanpai || Rajadamnern Stadium || Bangkok, Thailand || Decision || 5 || 3:00

|-  style="background:#fbb;"
| 1977-12-08 || Loss||align=left| Vicharnnoi Porntawee || Rajadamnern Stadium || Bangkok, Thailand || Decision || 5 || 3:00
|-
! style=background:white colspan=9 |
|-  style="background:#cfc;"
| 1977-10-18 || Win ||align=left| Jitti Muangkhonkaen || Lumpinee Stadium || Bangkok, Thailand || Decision || 5||3:00
|-
! style=background:white colspan=9 |

|-  style="background:#cfc;"
| 1977-08-17 || Win ||align=left| Nongkhai Sor.Prapatsorn || Rajadamnern Stadium || Bangkok, Thailand || Decision || 5||3:00

|-  style="background:#fbb;"
| 1977-07-06 || Loss ||align=left| Ruengsak Porntawee ||  || Bangkok, Thailand || Decision || 5 ||3:00

|-  style="background:#cfc;"
| 1977-06-02 || Win ||align=left| Vicharnnoi Porntawee || Rajadamnern Stadium || Bangkok, Thailand || Decision || 5 || 3:00

|-  style="background:#c5d2ea;"
| 1977-03-12 || NC ||align=left| Benny Urquidez || W.K.A. Event || Los Angeles, California, USA || (crowd riot) || 9 || 
|-
! style=background:white colspan=9 |

|-  style="background:#cfc;"
| 1977-02-24 || Win ||align=left| Sagat Petchyindee ||Lumpinee Stadium || Bangkok, Thailand || Decision || 5 || 3:00

|-  style="background:#cfc;"
| 1977-01-27 || Win ||align=left| Ruengsak Porntawee ||  || Bangkok, Thailand || Decision || 5 ||3:00

|-  style="background:#fbb;"
| 1976-12-15 || Loss ||align=left| Vicharnnoi Porntawee || Rajadamnern Stadium || Bangkok, Thailand || Decision || 5 || 3:00
|-
! style=background:white colspan=9 |

|-  style="background:#cfc;"
| 1976-10-28 || Win ||align=left| Wangwan Lukmatulee || Rajadamnern Stadium || Bangkok, Thailand || Decision || 5 ||3:00

|-  style="background:#cfc;"
| 1976-09-27 || Win ||align=left| Nongkhai Sor.Prapatsorn || Rajadamnern Stadium || Bangkok, Thailand || Decision || 5 ||3:00

|-  style="background:#cfc;"
| 1976-08-26 || Win ||align=left| Sagat Petchyindee ||Rajadamnern Stadium || Bangkok, Thailand || Decision || 5 || 3:00

|-  style="background:#fbb;"
| 1976-07-15 || Loss ||align=left| Nongkhai Sor.Prapatsorn || Rajadamnern Stadium || Bangkok, Thailand || Decision || 5 ||3:00
|-
! style=background:white colspan=9 |

|-  style="background:#fbb;"
| 1976-05-06 || Loss ||align=left| Khunponnoi Kiatsuriya || Rajadamnern Stadium || Bangkok, Thailand || Decision || 5 ||3:00

|-  style="background:#fbb;"
| 1976-03-31 || Loss ||align=left| Khunponnoi Kiatsuriya || Rajadamnern Stadium || Bangkok, Thailand || Decision || 5 ||3:00

|-  style="background:#fbb;"
| 1976-02-12 || Loss ||align=left| Vicharnnoi Porntawee || Rajadamnern Stadium || Bangkok, Thailand || Decision || 5 || 3:00
|-
! style=background:white colspan=9 |

|-  style="background:#cfc;"
| 1975-12-29 || Win ||align=left| Khunponnoi Kiatsuriya || Rajadamnern Stadium || Bangkok, Thailand || Decision || 5 ||3:00

|-  style="background:#cfc;"
| 1975-11-24 || Win ||align=left| Wangwon Lukmatulee || Rajadamnern Stadium || Bangkok, Thailand || Decision || 5 ||3:00

|-  style="background:#cfc;"
| 1975-09-29 || Win ||align=left| Jocky Sitkanpai || Rajadamnern Stadium || Bangkok, Thailand || Decision || 5 ||3:00

|-  style="background:#fbb;"
| 1975-08-14 || Loss ||align=left| Pudpadnoi Worawut || Lumpinee Stadium || Bangkok, Thailand || Decision || 5 || 3:00

|-  style="background:#cfc;"
| 1975-06-30 || Win ||align=left| Ruengsak Porntawee || Rajadamnern Stadium || Bangkok, Thailand || Decision || 5 ||3:00
|-
! style=background:white colspan=9 |

|-  style="background:#cfc;"
| 1975-04-24 || Win ||align=left| Jocky Sitkanpai || Rajadamnern Stadium || Bangkok, Thailand || Decision || 5 ||3:00

|-  style="background:#cfc;"
| 1975-03-31 || Win ||align=left| Nongkhai Sor.Prapatsorn || Rajadamnern Stadium || Bangkok, Thailand || Decision || 5 ||3:00

|-  style="background:#cfc;"
| 1975-02-27 || Win ||align=left| Suksawat Sithewet || Rajadamnern Stadium || Bangkok, Thailand || Decision || 5 ||3:00

|-  style="background:#cfc;"
| 1975-01-23 || Win ||align=left| Denthoraneenoi Luadthaksin || Rajadamnern Stadium || Bangkok, Thailand || Decision || 5 ||3:00

|-  style="background:#cfc;"
| 1972- || Win ||align=left| Permsiri Lukthokchan || Lumpinee Stadium || Bangkok, Thailand || KO || 2 ||
|-
! style=background:white colspan=9 |
|-
| colspan=9 | Legend:

See more
List of Muay Thai practitioners

References

1957 births
Living people
Narongnoi Kiatbandit
Narongnoi Kiatbandit